Schweder is a surname originally from the Bavaria area of Germany. Schweder is a local name for a person who lived in Swabia, a medieval dukedom that was in southwestern Germany.

Notable People 
J. Michael Schweder (1949–2021), American politician, member of the Pennsylvania House of Representatives
John Schweder (1927–2005), American football player who played offensive lineman
Tore Schweder (born 1943), Norwegian statistician and professor of economics

See also
Schweda